USS Rijndam (ID-2505) was a transport for the United States Navy during World War I. Both before and after her Navy service she was known as SS Rijndam or Ryndam as an ocean liner for the Holland America Line.

History 
Rijndam was launched during 1901 by Harland & Wolff Ltd. of Belfast, as a steel passenger liner for the Holland America Line.

On 18 January 1916, Rijndam suffered damage when she struck a mine in the Thames Estuary during World War I. American singer Alice Sjoselius was aboard, and wrote home to her family in Minnesota about the event.

Interned at New York later in World War I, she was seized during March 1918 by United States Customs officials along with 88 other Dutch vessels, 31 of which entered U.S. Navy service. Rijndam was commissioned 1 May 1918 at New York for service as a troopship.

American cruiser  served as escort for the assembled ships, which were the 35th U.S. convoy of the war. On 20 May, the convoy sighted and fired on a "submarine" that turned out to be a bucket; the next day escort Frederick left the convoy after being relieved by 11 destroyers. Three days later the convoy sighted land at 06:30 and anchored at Brest that afternoon.

On her return journey on 31 May 1918, Rijndam was nearly torpedoed in the same attack by German submarine  that resulted in the loss of President Lincoln.  Rijndam was able to avoid the torpedoes and, shortly afterward, nearly rammed a submarine cruising at periscope depth.

The convoy had a false alarm when a floating barrel was mistaken for submarine, but otherwise uneventfully arrived at Brest on the afternoon of 27 June.

Rijndam landed troops and supplies at Brest, France, on three more occasions through November 1918, and called once at Saint-Nazaire during July. Rijndam made seven round-trip voyages from Quiberon, Saint-Nazaire, and Brest, France, following the end of World War I, returning U.S. troops and personnel to Newport News, Virginia; Norfolk, Virginia; Hoboken, New Jersey; and New York.

In March 1919, Rijndam and  raced each other from Saint-Nazaire to Newport News in a friendly competition that received national press coverage in the United States. Rijndam, the slower ship, was just able to edge out the Matoika—and cut two days from her previous fastest crossing time—by appealing to the honor of the soldiers of the 133rd Field Artillery returning home aboard her and employing them as extra stokers for her boilers.

She carried over 3,000 passengers on many of her 26 trips across the Atlantic, completing her active service upon arrival at New York 4 August 1919 from Brest. Transferred from the Cruiser and Transport Force on 11 August 1919 to the custody of the 3rd Naval District, Rijndam was decommissioned and returned to her former owner on 22 October 1919 at New York. Rijndam resumed her mercantile career under the Dutch flag, remaining active until scrapped during 1929.

Notes

References

External links 
 

Ocean liners
Transports of the United States Navy
World War I auxiliary ships of the United States
Transport ships of the United States Army
Ships of the Holland America Line
Passenger ships of the Netherlands
Ships built in Belfast
1901 ships
Ships built by Harland and Wolff
Maritime incidents in 1915
Maritime incidents in 1916